Mykhailo Vasylyovych Chechetov (October 3, 1953 – February 27, 2015) was a Ukrainian politician. He was a former first deputy head of the Party of Regions parliamentary faction; and de facto its Chief Whip. Chechetov committed suicide on February 27, 2015.

Biography
Chechetov was born 3 October 1953 in the village of Lyubimovka (Korenevsky District) in current Russia; then the village was part of the USSR (as was Ukraine). In 1979 he graduated from Kharkiv Engineering and Economics Institute with a degree in economics and organization of mining industry. From 1971 1982 till he worked as a mechanic in a coal mine in Yenakiyevo. And from 1982 till 1994 Chechetov was a teacher at Kharkiv engineering economic institute.

From 1994 till 1997 Chechetov was a member of the Liberal Party of Ukraine. in the 1994 Ukrainian parliamentary election he was elected into parliament and joined the faction Socio-market choice. In 1998 and 1999  he served as Deputy Minister of Economy. From September 1999 to April 2003 Chechetov was First Deputy Chairman of the State Property Fund of Ukraine. From 1998 to 2005 Chechetov was a member of various economic commissions under President Kuchma. In the 2006 Ukrainian parliamentary election, 2007 Ukrainian parliamentary election and 2012 Ukrainian parliamentary election he returned to parliament for Party of Regions. After 2012 he became first deputy head of the party's parliamentary faction; and de facto its Chief Whip. Chechetov did not take part in the 2014 Ukrainian parliamentary election.

On January 20, 2015, the General Prosecutor's Office claimed Chechetov a suspect on suspicion of abuse of power and forgery. On February 21 he was bailed out for almost ₴5 million.

Chechetov committed suicide on the night of February 27, 2015, by jumping from the window of his apartment, located on the 17th floor. He left behind his wife Natalia Chechetov (born in 1954 and an employee of the Ukrainian parliament) and his daughter Tatiana Chechetov-Terashvili (born 1979 and a lecturer of the Kharkiv National University of Economics).

See also
 Oleksandr Peklushenko

Notes

References

1953 births
2015 deaths
People from Kursk Oblast
Ukrainian people of Russian descent
Soviet coal miners
Ukrainian mining engineers
Kharkiv National University of Economics alumni
Academic staff of the Kharkiv National University of Economics
National Academy of State Administration alumni
Directors of the State Property Fund of Ukraine
Second convocation members of the Verkhovna Rada
Fifth convocation members of the Verkhovna Rada
Sixth convocation members of the Verkhovna Rada
Seventh convocation members of the Verkhovna Rada
Independent politicians in Ukraine
Liberal Party of Ukraine politicians
Party of Regions politicians
Suicides by jumping in Ukraine
Ukrainian politicians who committed suicide
Recipients of the Order of Merit (Ukraine), 1st class
Recipients of the Order of Merit (Ukraine), 2nd class
Recipients of the Order of Merit (Ukraine), 3rd class
Recipients of the Honorary Diploma of the Cabinet of Ministers of Ukraine